The  struck Fukuoka Prefecture, Japan at 10:53 am JST on March 20, 2005, and lasted for approximately 1 minute. The Japan Meteorological Agency (JMA) measured it as peaking at a magnitude of 7.0, whereas the United States Geological Survey (USGS) reported a magnitude of 6.6. The quake occurred along a previously unknown fault in the Genkai Sea, North of Fukuoka city, and the residents of Genkai Island were forced to evacuate as houses collapsed and landslides occurred in places. Investigations subsequent to the earthquake determined that the new fault was most likely an extension of the known Kego fault that runs through the centre of the city.

Fukuoka is not as seismically active as many other parts of Japan, and was known prior to the earthquake as one of Japan's safest locations in terms of natural disasters; the previous earthquake, a magnitude 5, had occurred over a hundred years ago and it had been centuries since the city had experienced a serious earthquake.

City Introduction
Fukuoka is located in the northern Kyushu, Japan, and it is in the center of  the Fukuoka plain. Fukuoka is the most populous and developed prefecture in Kyushu. Geographically, Fukuoka is close to mainland East Asia, and the nearest megacity to Fukuoka is Seoul, South Korea, rather than a domestic Japanese city, and Fukuoka is about as far from Shanghai as Tokyo. As a result, Fukuoka has been the window of east Asian culture flowing into Japan since ancient times, and now there are many direct routes to Korea, mainland China and Taiwan.

Description
The strong earthquake occurred at 10:53 am in the Kyushu region, about 70 km west of Shimonoseki city in Yamaguchi prefecture. The depth of the earthquake was extremely shallow, with a presumed Richter scale of 7.0.  The Japan meteorological agency said that quake's epicenter was in the sea of Japan, northwest of Fukuoka prefecture, and the epicenter was about 9 kilometers under the sea. As of 6 p.m. local time, the earthquake has caused 381 people injured and one dead. Kyodo News Agency, citing Japan's meteorological agency, said it was the strongest earthquake to hit Kyushu since May 1997, and the first to exceed magnitude 6 since 1898. Earthquake experts in Japan said it is rare for a strong earthquake to strike the area. A quake measuring about seven on the Richter scale struck three hundred years ago, but no major quake has struck after that.

Fukuoka's most famous major fault, the Kego fault, runs northwest to southeast, roughly parallel to Nishitetsu's Ōmuta train line, and was thought to be 22 km long, terminating at Hakata Bay. It is estimated to be able to produce earthquakes as strong as magnitude 7 at the epicenter approximately once every 15,000 years. When a center is located at a depth of 10 km, it would cause an earthquake of a lower-6 magnitude (similar to the March 20, 2005 earthquake) in downtown Fukuoka. The probability of an earthquake along the known length of the Kego fault occurring within 30 years was estimated at 0.4% prior to the March 20, 2005 earthquake, but this probability has been revised upwards since. According to a National Institute of Advanced Industrial Science and Technology presentation April 12, 2005 , supposing the last Kego earthquake had occurred 13,000 years ago, the probability of major activity within 30 years had been revised to 7%, or it were 7,000 years ago, the probability had been revised to 4%. Suppose that an earthquake had occurred along the Kego fault within the last 2000 years, the risk would be unchanged.

M5.8 aftershock on April 20
An aftershock hit at 6:11 a.m. April 20 on Japan's southern main island of Kyūshū, the Central Meteorological Agency reported. Although considerable time had passed since the first quake, the aftershock was not unexpected. The quake, which swayed buildings and shattered some outer walls, was measured to have magnitude of 5.8. 2 and 56 people were severely and slightly injured and treated at a hospital in Fukuoka due to the quake and there were temporary closures of major highways, railway services and Fukuoka's airport. Following reports that the city has only prepared for earthquakes up to a magnitude of 6.5, the aftershock renewed fears that the quakes might cause the Kego fault to become active again beneath Fukuoka, leading to an earthquake as big as, or bigger than, the March 20 quake.

In order to more accurately estimate the risk of ongoing or increased seismic activity, teams from Tokyo University, Kōchi University, Hiroshima University and Ōita University surveyed Hakata Bay to determine how far the Kego fault extends. Preliminary results, announced May 1, 2005 indicated that the fault extends nearly as far as Nokonoshima, 2.5 km out into the bay, though no sign of recent activity along the fault was uncovered. The teams also discovered a new fault in the Higashi-ku portion of Hakata Bay. Later findings indicated that the fault responsible for both the March 20 and April 20 quakes was likely an extension of the Kego fault, making its total length approximately 40 km.

Aftershocks
After the main shock of the Fukuoka earthquake, several smaller aftershocks happened around the source. By 9 p.m. Tuesday, 85 aftershocks had been recorded. Within a month of the quake, there were four aftershocks with a magnitude of more than 5, including the largest one of M5.8 on April 20. Within half a year the size of aftershocks continued, a total of several thousand times, but the overall trend gradually reduced.

Effects of Earthquake

Architecture
During this earthquake, more than half of the 225 residential buildings on the Genkai Island in the western part of Fukuoka city, near the epicenter, suffered serious damage. The island was particularly hard hit because it near to the quake and traditional Japanese homes are less vulnerable to earthquakes than "mansions" that are built by engineers. In Kaido, about 120 homes were destroyed and another 55 damaged partially. Traditional Japanese houses, particularly in the areas of Daimyō and Imaizumi, were the most heavily damaged and many were marked for demolition. Insurance payments for damage were estimated at approximately 15.8 billion yen. In Tenjin, many windows were smashed and concrete cracked. Temples and shrines were also damaged a lot. More than half of the 225 residential buildings on the Genkai Island in the western part of Fukuoka city, near the epicenter, suffered serious damage

Transportation
According to public broadcaster NHK, local rail services were suspended after the tremors triggered an automatic safety mechanism. The operation of the San'yō Shinkansen between Shin-Yamaguchi and Hakata was temporarily suspended. The cracks appeared on sidewalks in residential areas.

Other Effects
Officials reported water and gas breaks and power outages. Telephone service in the southern prefecture was jammed after an automatic safety mechanism was triggered by the tremors. The quake also caused 103 gas leaks. The meteorological agency issued a tsunami warning after the strong earthquake, but lifted it at noon. Landslides occurred around Fukuoka, Saga and Nagasaki prefectures.

The impact on Other Countries
Kyushu, which is separated from South Korea by a narrow strait, was felt about 130 miles from the South Korean port city of Busan, where it briefly shook buildings. A Busan police spokesman said no damage was immediately reported.

Images

See also
List of earthquakes in 2005
List of earthquakes in Japan

References

External links

From Fukuoka with photos

2005 disasters in Japan
Earthquakes of the Heisei period
Fukuoka Earthquake, 2005
Fukuoka earthquake
March 2005 events in Japan
Landslides in Japan